Olin A. Dutra (January 17, 1901 – May 5, 1983) was an American professional golfer who played on the PGA Tour in the 1920s and 1930s. He won two major titles, the PGA Championship in 1932 and the U.S. Open in 1934, and was the first major champion born in the western United States.

Early life 
Born in Monterey, California, Dutra was a descendant of early Spanish settlers in California. At age nine, he and his older brother Mortimer were introduced to golf as a caddies at the country club in Del Monte, where the club professional was Macdonald Smith. For years, they woke up very early to practice golf before going to work. Early in his career, Dutra worked at a hardware store for five years.

Professional career 
In 1923, Dutra resigned from a job at his father's hardware store to become a golf professional. His best years as a golf professional were in the early 1930s, when he won his two majors and played on the 1933 and 1935 Ryder Cup teams. In the 1932 PGA Championship in St. Paul, Dutra played 196 holes and finished an astounding 19-under-par. He was the medalist in the 36-hole qualifier and won his five matches by comfortable margins (9 & 8, 5 & 3, 5 & 4, 3 & 2, and 4 & 3).

Dutra is best remembered for his performance at the 1934 U.S. Open at Merion near Philadelphia. More than a year earlier, Dutra became afflicted with amoebic dysentery, an often uncomfortable and painful intestinal infection. While traveling east from Los Angeles, Dutra stopped in the Detroit area to meet up with his brother Mortie, as both were entered in the Open, and began to feel very ill. He spent a short time in the hospital, casting doubt whether he could even play in the tournament. After the first two rounds, Dutra was eight strokes behind the leaders and in 18th place. On the eve of the 36-hole final day, he had an attack of dysentery, forcing him to snack on sugar cubes throughout the day. He was still able to shoot a 71-72, and held off 54-hole leader Gene Sarazen to win by a single stroke. (Mortie Dutra finished tied for 28th.)

Dutra began his career as a club pro in Fresno, California at Fort Washington Country Club for several years and then was at Sunnyside Country Club for a year. He won his two majors as the pro at Brentwood Country Club in Los Angeles, and moved over to Wilshire Country Club in 1935. (It was later revealed she had previous golf experience.) Dutra later worked in Mexico City, then back in California in Avila Beach and Watsonville. In 1966, Dutra was inducted into the Fresno County Athletic Hall of Fame. He died after an extended illness at age 82 in Newman in Stanislaus County. Dutra and his wife Gladys are buried in the Hills Ferry Cemetery in Newman.

Professional wins

PGA Tour wins (10)
1929 (1) National Orange Open
1930 (2) Long Beach Open (tie with Joe Kirkwood, Sr.), Southern California Pro
1932 (3) Metropolitan Open, North Shore Chicago Open, PGA Championship
1934 (2) U.S. Open, Miami Biltmore Open
1936 (2) Sunset Fields Open, True Temper Open

Other wins
1922 Del Monte Match Play
1930 Southern California PGA Championship
1931 Southern California PGA Championship, California State Match Play, Pacific Southwest PGA
1932 Southern California PGA Championship
1933 Southern California PGA Championship
1938 Southern California PGA Championship
1940 Southern California PGA Championship, California State Open

Major championships

Wins (2)

The PGA Championship was match play until 1958.

Results timeline

NYF = tournament not yet founded
NT = no tournament
WD = withdrew
DNQ = did not qualify for match play portion
CUT = missed the half-way cut
R64, R32, R16, QF, SF = round in which player lost in PGA Championship match play
"T" indicates a tie for a place

Summary

References

External links
 – Looking back: 1934 U.S. Open
PGA Museum of Golf: Hall of Fame – member profiles

Trenham Golf History – 1934 U.S. Open

American male golfers
PGA Tour golfers
Ryder Cup competitors for the United States
Winners of men's major golf championships
Golfers from California
Sportspeople from Monterey, California
People from Stanislaus County, California
1901 births
1983 deaths